Hallsmead Ait is an island in the River Thames in Berkshire, England.  It is on the reach above Shiplake Lock near Lower Shiplake.

The island is large and triangular shaped, forming a pair with The Lynch, a similar shaped island. It is uninhabited and covered with a wide variety of trees. Although it is positioned towards the Oxfordshire bank of the river, it is actually in Berkshire.

Berry Brook starts close to the Redgrave-Pinsent Rowing Lake to the southwest, running northeast through the Thames floodplain, before joining the river at Hallsmead Ait.

See also
Islands in the River Thames

References

Islands of Berkshire
Islands of the River Thames
Borough of Wokingham